George Woodman (10 May 1900 – 1 June 1953) was  a former Australian rules footballer who played with Footscray in the Victorian Football League (VFL).

Notes

External links 
		

1900 births
1953 deaths
Australian rules footballers from Victoria (Australia)
Footscray Football Club (VFA) players
Western Bulldogs players